Brandreth is a surname. Notable people with the surname include:

Benjamin Brandreth (1809-1880), New York politician and patent medicine manufacturer
Courtenay Brandreth (1891–1947), wildlife artist from New York
George A. Brandreth (1828-1897), New York politician and patent medicine manufacturer
Gyles Brandreth (born 1948), a British celebrity, author and former politician
Jeremiah Brandreth (1790-1817), an English activist hanged for treason
Thomas Shaw Brandreth (1788–1873), inventor and classical scholar
Thomas Brandreth  (1825–1894), Royal Navy admiral and Lord of the Admiralty